The Radar Imager for Mars' subsurface experiment (RIMFAX) is a ground-penetrating radar on NASA's Perseverance rover, part of the Mars 2020 mission. It uses radar waves to see geologic features under the surface.

The device can make detections perhaps dozens of meters/yards underneath ground, such as for buried sand dunes or lava feature. During development a detection range of about 10 yards/meters was targeted, and tests on glaciers were successful.

RIMFAX takes its name from Hrímfaxi, the horse in Norse mythology that "faithfully brings the night."

The radar will operate at radio frequencies of 150–1200 MHz and will use a Bow-Tie Slot antenna.

Overview 
RIMFAX is a ground-penetrating radar, its antenna is located on the lower rear of the Perseverance rover. It will be able to image different ground densities, structural layers, buried rocks, meteorites, and detect underground water ice and salty brine at  depth.

Ground-penetrating radars (GPR) send radio frequency electromagnetic waves into the ground and then detect the reflected signals as a function of time to reveal subsurface structure as well as composition. RIMFAX is based on a number of GPR instruments developed at the Norwegian Defence Research Establishment (FFI). RIMFAX was selected by NASA to be one of the instruments on the Mars 2020 rover in July 2014. RIMFAX will provide the science team with the capability to assess the shallow layers and their stratigraphic relationship to nearby outcrops, and thus a window into the geological history and associated environmental history.

The RIMFAX instrument was developed and built by FFI, and it was delivered to NASA's Jet Propulsion Laboratory for integration with the rover in December 2018. Due to Mars's 24.5 hour long day, RIMFAX operations are shared between centers at University of California, Los Angeles (UCLA) and the University of Oslo (UiO), swapping every two weeks. The RIMFAX data will be archived by NASA's Planetary Data System. The RIMFAX principal investigator is Svein-Erik Hamran of FFI, and his team includes scientists from Norway, Canada and the United States.

Specifications 
RIMFAX employs a gated Frequency Modulated Continuous Wave (FMCW) waveform to probe the subsurface. Gated FMCW utilizes a single antenna for both transmission and reception, quickly switching the antenna between the transmitter and the receiver. RIMFAX will be commanded to acquire radar soundings every 10–20 cm along the rover's path to create two-dimensional GPR images of subsurface structure.

Development 
An engineering model of RIMFAX was tested in several locations, primarily in Svalbard, and in the US Southwest. Modelling was carried out with gprMax, an open source electromagnetic simulation tool, to assess the imaging potential at the landing site.

Contemporaries 
Other Mars radar experiments include SHARAD, MARSIS, and WISDOM.

See also 

 Space-based radar

External links 

 NASA project homepage
 FFI project homepage
 RIMFAX data on the Planetary Data System
 gprMAX Electromagnetic simulation software

References 

Mars 2020 instruments
Geophysical imaging
Space radars